Shen Zhenshu (born 18 July 1961) is a Chinese speed skater. She competed in the women's 1000 metres at the 1980 Winter Olympics.

References

1961 births
Living people
Chinese female speed skaters
Olympic speed skaters of China
Speed skaters at the 1980 Winter Olympics
Place of birth missing (living people)